The 1999 Women's Hockey International Challenge was a women's field hockey tournament, consisting of a series of test matches. It was held in Canberra and Perth, from 28 April to 9 May, 1999.

Australia won the tournament, defeating South Africa 5–0 in the final. India finished in third place after winning the third place match 4–3 in penalties, defeating South Korea.

Competition format
The tournament featured the national teams of Australia, India, South Africa and South Korea. The teams competed in a double round-robin format, with each team playing each other twice. Three points were awarded for a win, one for a draw, and none for a loss.

Officials
The following umpires were appointed by the International Hockey Federation to officiate the tournament:

 Judith Barnesby (AUS)
 Renée Cohen (NED)
 Marelize de Klerk (RSA)
 Lee Mi-Ok (KOR)
 Jane Nockolds (ENG)

Results

Preliminary round

Fixtures

Classification round

Third and fourth place

Final

Statistics

Final standings

Goalscorers

References

External links
Hockey Australia

Field hockey in Australia
Women's international field hockey competitions